Nunatarsuaq may refer to the following nunataks in Greenland:

 Nunatarsuaq, a nunatak on the coast of Melville Bay in northwestern Greenland
 Nunatarsuaq (Tasiusaq Bay), a nunatak on the coast of Tasiusaq Bay in northwestern Greenland
 Nunatarsuaq (Inglefield Fjord), a nunatak at the head of the Inglefield Fjord in northwestern Greenland